The West Central Conference  is a high school conference in western central Illinois. The conference participates in athletics and activities in the Illinois High School Association. The conference comprises 11 small public high schools and 1 private high school with enrollments between 120-590 students in Adams, Hancock, McDonough, Pike, and Warren counties.

History
The West Central conference was formed in 1969 with Brown County, Camp Point Central, Carthage, Hamilton, Mendon Unity and Warsaw its charter football members. The first new addition to the football wars was Rushville in 1984.  There was no West Central conference for football in 1998, the league's teams participated under the Western Illinois Conference which the North division consisted of Avon/Roseville coop, Carthage, Monmouth Yorkwood, Sciota NW/LaHarpe coop, Spoon River Valley and Stronghurst Southern. The South consisted of Brown County, Camp Point Central coop, Hamilton, Mendon Unity, Rushville and Warsaw coop. The West Central name was restored in 1999 for football with the previous 7 teams plus Beardstown, Pittsfield and the Sciota NW/La Harpe coop forming a 10 team loop. In 2003 Colchester joined the Sciota NW/LaHarpe coop and it was renamed West Prairie. In 2004 Hamilton and Warsaw began the West Hancock coop and the Biggsville Union/Stronghurst Southern coop addition kept this a 10 team circuit. In 2005 both Brown County and the Biggsville/Stronghurst coop left and Pleasant Plains was added. From 2006-07 to 2009-10 the league's football teams played in the West Prairie Trail mega football conference. In 2010 Beardstown and Rushville-Industry left for the Prairieland Conference; and West Prairie left for the Lincoln Trial Conference. In 2010 Macomb, Monmouth-Roseville, Orion, Rockridge, and Sherrard joined from the Olympic Conference; Griggsville-Perry, Liberty, and Payson-Seymour joined from the Pike County Conference, the latter three schools (along with Pittsfield and Western) maintaining concurrent membership in both conferences.

Member Schools

North Division

Sources:IHSA Conferences, IHSA Coop Teams, and IHSA Member Schools Directory

2017-18 Administration and Leadership
President: Cyle Rigg, Southeastern High School

Contact: Matt Long, Central High School

Cooperative Arrangements
Hamilton+Warsaw=West Hancock coop for all sports
Payson-Seymour and Unity coop for football
Western and Pleasant Hill (Pike County Conference) coop only for football

Football
The West Central Conference for football has 3 teams. Those 3 teams are: West Hancock(Hamilton/Warsaw), Quincy Notre Dame, and Macomb. The rest of the schools play in nearby conferences. Monmouth-Roseville plays in the Three Rivers (Mississippi) Conference. The Payson-Seymour and Unity coop play in the Western Illinois Valley (North) Conference. Also Central plays in the Western Illinois Valley (North) Conference.  The Western and Pleasant Hill coop plays in the Western Illinois Valley (South) Conference. Liberty and Southeastern do not play football.

Former Members

Sources:IHSA Conferences, IHSA Coop Teams, and IHSA Member Schools Directory

Competitive Success
The West Central Conference has won 11 state championships in IHSA sponsored athletics and activities, 12 including championships my member school participating in the West Prairie Trail conference, at the conclusion of the 2008-2009 academic year.

State Champions

Boys Basketball
Pittsfield (1990-1991 A)
Warsaw (1996-1997 A)

Boys Football
Carthage (1995-1996 1A)
Carthage (1998-1999 1A)
Carthage (1999-2000 1A)
Carthage (2000-2001 1A)
Illini West (2008-2009 3A)*
Illini West (2010-2011 3A)

*as member of West Prairie Trail Conference

Boys Golf
Pittsfield (1982-1983 A)

Girls Basketball
Carthage (1992-1993 A)
Hancock Central (1991-1992 A)
West Hancock (Hamilton-Warsaw) (2007-2008 2A)

Conference Shakeup
The makeup of the West Central Conference changed dramatically in 2010. Many member schools departed, many of them for the Prairieland Conference. In their place came the remaining members of the now-dissolved Olympic Conference. The conference then divided into north and south divisions for most athletics and activities.

See also
 List of Illinois High School Association member conferences

References

External links
 West Central Conference - Football
 Central High School
 Griggsville-Perry High School
 Hamilton High School
 Illini West High School
 Liberty High School
 Macomb High School
 Monmouth-Roseville High School
 Orion High School
 Payson-Seymour High School
 Pittsfield High School
 Rockridge High School
 Sherrard High School
 Southeastern High School
 Unity High School
 Warsaw High School
 Western High School

High school sports conferences and leagues in the United States
Illinois high school sports conferences
High school sports in Illinois
1969 establishments in Illinois